The second capture of Chusan occurred on 1October 1841 during the First Opium War when British forces captured the city of Dinghai, capital of the Chusan (Zhoushan) islands off the east Chinese coast.

The fortified city of Dinghai, with a population of 30,000, was defended by the Chinese under the command of Keo. After a brief one-sided seaborne operation involving the 55th Foot, the city fell to the far superior British forces which captured 100 iron guns, 36 brass cannon, and 540 gingalls (heavy muskets or light guns mounted on swivels) for the loss of 2 British  killed and 28 wounded.

Gallery

Notes

References 
MacPherson, Duncan (1843). Two Years in China (2nd ed.). London: Saunders and Otley

Further reading 
Murray, Alexander (1843). Doings in China. London: Richard Bentley. pp. 23–42.

1841 in China
Chusan 2
Conflicts in 1841
Chusan 2
September 1841 events
October 1841 events
Amphibious operations involving the United Kingdom